Chris Horn (born July 13, 1977) is a former American football wide receiver. He played in the Indoor Football League from 2000, and was actively rostered in the NFL from 2004 to 2005, for the Kansas City Chiefs.

Early years
Horn played college football at Rocky Mountain College in Billings, Montana. He is the only player from Rocky Mountain College to make the National Football League.

Professional career
Chris Horn signed with his first professional team, the Billings Thunderbolts of the Indoor Football League in 2000. He then moved to the AFL, playing for the Arizona Rattlers from 2001–2003.

Horn entered the National Football League (NFL) as a free agent in 2003 signing with the Kansas City Chiefs spending four games on their practice squad. In 2004, he was allocated the Amsterdam Admirals of NFL Europa. In the 2004 NFL season, Horn began the year with the Chiefs on the practice squad until he was signed to their active roster on September 26.
His first career touchdown came on September 26, 2004 against the Houston Texans. His first career start came in the 2005 season on October 13 against the San Diego Chargers.

In 2006, Chris Horn attended the New Orleans Saints training camp but was waived before the season started. In 2007, he had a similar experience with the Carolina Panthers.

In 2008, Horn was acquired in a trade with the Philadelphia Soul by the New Orleans VooDoo in the Arena Football League. Horn was released by New Orleans on March 10, 2008.

Personal life
Chris and his family are devout Roman Catholics. Horn speaks regularly as a part of the Catholic Athletes for Christ ministry.

References

External links

AFL stats

1977 births
Living people
American football wide receivers
Billings Outlaws players
Arizona Rattlers players
Kansas City Chiefs players
Amsterdam Admirals players
New Orleans VooDoo players
Rocky Mountain Battlin' Bears football players
Players of American football from Idaho
Sportspeople from Boise, Idaho
Catholics from Idaho